The Cloncurry Advocate was a newspaper published in Cloncurry, Queensland between 1889 and 1953.

History
The Cloncurry Advocate was published by  A.J. Hensley from 1989 to 1953. From 1953 to 1966 the Cloncurry Advocate was incorporated with the Western Mail and was renamed the Mt Isa Mail. In 1966 the Mt Isa Mail became the North West Star, which is still in publication.

Digitisation 
The paper has been digitised as part of the Australian Newspapers Digitisation Program  of the National Library of Australia.

See also
 List of newspapers in Australia

References

External links
 
 The North West Star.

Cloncurry Advocate
Cloncurry, Queensland
1889 establishments in Australia
Publications established in 1889
1953 disestablishments in Australia
Publications disestablished in 1953